John Gray (1817–1872) was a Roman Catholic bishop who served as the Vicar Apostolic of the Western District of Scotland.

Born in Buckie, Moray on 16 June 1817, he was the son of William Gray and Joanna Gray (née Scott). He entered the Scots College in Rome on 30 September 1838, and took the oath on 25 March 1839. He was ordained a subdeacon on 27 March 1841, a deacon on 10 April 1841, and a priest on 1 May 1841. He left the Scots College for the mission in Scotland on 17 April 1843.

He was appointed the Coadjutor Vicar Apostolic of the Western District and Titular Bishop of Ipsus by the Holy See on 6 May 1862, and  consecrated to the Episcopate at St Andrew's Cathedral, Glasgow on 19 October 1862. The principal consecrator was David Moriarty, Bishop of Ardfert and Aghadoe, and the principal co-consecrators were Bishop James Kyle and Bishop John Murdoch.

On the death of Bishop John Murdoch on 15 December 1865, he automatically succeeded as the Vicar Apostolic of the Western District. The following year, James Lynch was appointed Coadjutor Vicar Apostolic to Bishop Gray on 31 August 1866.

Bishop Gray resigned as Vicar Apostolic of the Western District on 4 March 1869. However, he was not succeeded by Bishop Lynch, who was relieved of his Scottish coadjutorship on 4 April 1869 and translated to the coadjutorship of Kildare and Leighlin in Ireland on 13 April 1869, and eventually succeeded as bishop of that diocese on 5 March 1888. Instead, Bishop Gray was succeeded by Archbishop Charles Petre Eyre, who was appointed Apostolic Administrator of the Western District on 16 April 1869.

Bishop Gray died on 14 January 1872, aged 54.

References 

1817 births
1872 deaths
Apostolic vicars of Scotland
19th-century Roman Catholic bishops in Scotland
People from Moray
Scottish Roman Catholic bishops